The Big Green Bus is a project that was founded in 2005 to promote sustainability and renewable energy sources run by Dartmouth College students. Students converted a used school bus to run on waste vegetable oil (WVO), but in 2009 upgraded to a 1998 MCI coach bus.

The BGB is part of the Dartmouth Outing Club and is entirely student-run. The group stops at various public events, as well as schools, camps and other gatherings of people to make educational presentations. The program also educates participants about how to manage an environmental project. The BGB provides tips and educational points through its presentations and its websites.

The interior of the green bus has bamboo floors, recycled glass countertops, and solar panels to energize the light on this bus. The green bus was redesigned from a conventional but to achieve a sustainable yet comfortable living space. 

The Green Bus runs on waste vegetable oil collected from restaurants along the trip of the bus. The Green Bus has a 300 gallon tank that would cover 1500 miles. 

In 2009, fifteen students traveled on the Big Green Bus tour over 10 weeks across the country promoting environmental awareness.

References

External links 

Dartmouth Outing Club Listing
Dartmouth Outing Club Wiki Listing

Dartmouth College
Green buses
Environmentalism in the United States
Student organizations in the United States
Dartmouth College student organizations
2005 establishments in New Hampshire